Bledar Hajdini (born 19 June 1995) is a Kosovo Albanian professional footballer who last played as a goalkeeper for Kosovan club Llapi.

Club career

Early career
Hajdini began his football career playing for hometown club Hysi at the age of ten. During his time at the club, one of his youth coaches described him as a "gifted" goalkeeper, he spent eight years at the club before moving to Prishtina in 2013 and played two years before moving to Trepça'89.

Trepça'89
In June 2015, Hajdini joined Football Superleague of Kosovo side Trepça'89.

Llapi
On 1 June 2018, Hajdini joined Football Superleague of Kosovo side Llapi.

Loan at Ballkani
On 14 December 2018, Hajdini joined Football Superleague of Kosovo side Ballkani, on loan until the end of 2018–19 season.

International career
On 2 October 2016, Hajdini received a call-up from Kosovo for a 2018 FIFA World Cup qualification matches against Croatia and Ukraine. On 13 November 2017, he made his debut with Kosovo in a friendly match against Latvia after coming on as a substitute at 68th minute in place of Samir Ujkani.

Personal life
Hajdini was born in Fürstenfeldbruck, Germany from Kosovo Albanian parents from Podujevo.

References

External links

1995 births
Living people
People from Fürstenfeldbruck (district)
Sportspeople from Upper Bavaria
Footballers from Bavaria
Kosovo Albanians
Association football goalkeepers
Kosovan footballers
Kosovo international footballers
German footballers
German people of Kosovan descent
German people of Albanian descent
Sportspeople of Albanian descent
KF Trepça'89 players
KF Llapi players
KF Ballkani players
Football Superleague of Kosovo players